The Feather River Railway was built in 1922 for the Hutchinson Lumber Company to bring logs from Feather Falls, California, to a connection with the Western Pacific Railroad (WP) at Bidwell, California. The WP would then transport the logs to the Hutchinson sawmill in Oroville, California. The sawmill burned in 1927; and the railway was unused through the Great Depression until reorganized as a common carrier in 1938 to serve a new sawmill built at Feather Falls. Georgia-Pacific purchased the sawmill and railway in 1955. The railway ceased operation after portions of the grade were flooded by Oroville Dam during the Christmas flood of 1964.

Locomotives

Notes

Logging railroads in the United States
Transportation in Butte County, California
Defunct California railroads
History of Butte County, California
1922 establishments in California
1966 disestablishments in California